The following is a list of pilots and other aircrew who flew during the Battle of Britain, and were awarded the Battle of Britain Clasp to the 1939–45 Star by flying at least one authorised operational sortie with an eligible unit of the Royal Air Force or Fleet Air Arm during the period from 0001 hours on 10 July to 2359 hours 31 October 1940.

History
In 1942, the Air Ministry made the decision to compile a list from records of the names of pilots who had lost their lives as a result of the fighting during the Battle of Britain for the purpose of building a national memorial. This became the Battle of Britain Chapel at Westminster Abbey, which was unveiled by King George VI on 10 July 1947. The Roll of Honour within the Chapel contains the names of 1,497 pilots and aircrew killed or mortally wounded during the Battle.

Nothing was done officially, however, to define the qualifications for the classification of a Battle of Britain airman until 9 November 1960. AMO N850, published by the Air Ministry, stated for the first time the requirements for the awarding of the Battle of Britain Star, and listed the 71 units which were deemed to have been under the control of RAF Fighter Command.

In 1955 Flt Lt John Holloway, a serving RAF officer, began a personal challenge to compile a complete list of "The Few". After fourteen years of research Flt Lt Holloway had 2,946 names on the list. Of these airmen, 537 were killed during the Battle or later died of wounds received.

The Battle of Britain Memorial Trust, founded by Geoffrey Page, raised funds for the construction of the Battle of Britain Memorial at Capel-le-Ferne near Folkestone in Kent. The Memorial, unveiled by Queen Elizabeth The Queen Mother on 9 July 1993, shares the site with the Christopher Foxley-Norris Memorial Wall on which a complete list of "The Few" is engraved.

More recently, the Battle of Britain Monument on the Victoria Embankment in London was unveiled on 18 September 2005 by Charles, Prince of Wales and his wife Camilla, Duchess of Cornwall. The idea for the monument was conceived by the Battle of Britain Historical Society which then set about raising funds for its construction. The outside of the monument is lined with bronze plaques listing all the Allied airmen who took part in the Battle.

D

E

F
{|class="wikitable"
|-
!Name!!Rank!!Nationality!!Sqn during Battle!!Awards!!Notes
|-
|Fajtl, František||Flt Lt||CZ||17 & 1 Sqns||||Died 4 October 2006
|-
|Falkowski, Jan Pawel||Fg Off||POL||32 Sqn||VM, KW***, DFC||
|-
|Farley, Walter Ronald||Flt Lt||BR||156 & 46 Sqns||DFC||KIA 21 April 1942 (as Wg Cdr, CO of 138 Sqn)
|-
|Farmer, James Nigel Watts||Flt Lt||BR||302 Sqn||||
|-
|Farnes, Eric||Plt Off||BR||141 Sqn||||Died 23 September 1985
|-
|Farnes, Paul Caswell Powe||Sgt||BR||501 Sqn||DFM||Official Ace. Died 28 January 2020. Last surviving ace of the battle.
|-
|Farquhar, Andrew Douglas||Wg Cdr||BR||257 Sqn||DFC||Died mid-1960s
|-
|Farrow, John Robinson||Sgt||BR||229 Sqn||||KIA 8 October 1940 (Pilot)
|-
|Fathing, John||Sgt||BR||235 Sqn||||
|-
|Fawcett, Derek P||Sgt||BR||29 Sqn||||KIA 15 September 1941
|-
|Fayolle, Emile Francois Marie Leonce||Plt Off (Adj)||Free FR||85 Sqn||DFC, CdeL||KIA 14 August 1942
|-
|Fearns, Francis||Sgt||BR||601 Sqn||||Service details unknown
|- style="background:#2ee;"
|Feary, Alan Norman||Sgt||BR||609 Sqn||||Official Ace, KIA 7 October 1940 (Pilot)
|- style="background:#2ee;"
|Feather, John Leslie||Sgt||BR||235 Sqn||||KIA 18 September 1940
|- style="background:#2ee;"
|Fechtner, Emil||Plt Off||CZ||310 Sqn||DFC||KIA 29 October 1940
|-
|Fejfar, Stanislav||Plt Off||CZ||310 Sqn||||KIA 17 May 1942
|- style="background:#2ee;"
|Fenemore, Stanley Allen||Sgt||BR||245 & 501 Sqn||||KIA 15 October 1940
|-
|Fenn, Cecil Francis||Sgt||BR||248 Sqn||||Died 27 December 1987
|-
|Fenton, Harold Arthur||Sqn Ldr||BR||238 Sqn (CO)||CBE, DSO, DFC||Retired 1957
|-
|Fenton, John Ollis||Plt Off||BR||235 Sqn||||KIA 28 May 1941
|-
|Fenton, Walter Gordon||Sgt||NZ||604 Sqn||||
|-
|Fenwick, Charles Raymond||Plt Off||BR||610 Sqn||||
|-
|Fenwick, Samuel Green||Plt Off||BR||601 Sqn||||Buried with RAF honours in Devon 2007
|-
|Ferdinand, Roy Fredrick||Plt Off||BR||263 Sqn||||KIA 12 June 1941
|-
|Ferguson, Eric Hannah||Sgt||BR||141 Sqn||||KIA 11 April 1943
|-
|Ferguson, Peter John||Sqn Ldr||BR||602 Sqn||||
|-
|Feric, Miroslaw||Plt Off||POL||303 Sqn||VM, KW*, DFC||KIFA Feb 1942
|- style="background:#2ee;"
|Ferriss, Henry Michael||Flt Lt||BR||111 Sqn||DFC||Official Ace, KIA 16 August 1940
|-
|Fildes, Frank||AC||BR||25 Sqn||||
|-
|Finch||Sgt||BR||615 Sqn||||Service details unknown
|-
|Finch, T R H||Fg Off||BR||151 Sqn||||Service details unknown
|-
|Finlay, Donald Osborne "Don"||Sqn Ldr||BR||41 & 54 Sqns||DFC, AFC, MiD||Official Ace; Died 19 April 1970
|-
|Finnie, Archibald||Plt Off||BR||54 Sqn||||KIA 25 July 1940
|-
|Finnis, John Frederick Fortescue||Flt Lt||SR||1 & 229 Sqns||||
|-
|Finucane, Brendan Eamonn Fergus "Paddy"||Wg Cdr||IRE||65 Sqn||DSO, DFC**||KIA 15 July 1942
|-
|Fisher, Anthony George Anson||Fg Off||BR||111 Sqn||||Died July 1988
|- style="background:#2ee;"
|Fisher, Basil Mark||Fg Off||BR||111 Sqn||||KIA 15 August 1940
|-
|Fisher, Gerald||Fg Off||BR||602 Sqn||||Died 1973
|- style="background:#2ee;"
|Fiske, William Meade Lindsley "Billy"||Plt Off||AME||601 Sqn||||KIA 17 August 1940
|-
|Fitzgerald, Thomas Bernard||Fg Off||NZ||141 Sqn||DFC||Born Timaru, New Zealand, 11 July 1917 Short Service Commission in RAF, Jun 1938; made war's first single-engined operational flight when he dropped leaflets over Frankfurt and tested night defences, 19 September 1939; Personal Assistant to Gen Hoyt D. Vandenberg, USAAF, Feb 1945; relinquished commission as Flt Lt (Temp. Sqn Ldr) on appointment to RNZAF, Feb 1946; retired Dec 1947. Died Christchurch, New Zealand, 12 August 2006
|-
|Fizel, Joseph Francis||AC1||BR||29 Sqn||||Died 29 August 1976; Also spelt "Fizell"
|-
|Fleming, John||Fg Off||NZ||605 Sqn||MBE||
|- style="background:#2ee;"
|Fleming, Robert David Spittall||Plt Off||BR||249 Sqn||||KIA 7 September 1940
|-
|Fletcher, Andrew William||Sqn Ldr||CAN||235 Sqn||DFC||
|-
|Fletcher, John Denys||Sgt||BR||3 Sqn||||KIA 8 February 1942
|- style="background:#2ee;"
|Fletcher, John Gordon Bewley||Sgt||BR||604 Sqn||||KIA 25 August 1940 Blenheim L6782 crashed near Witheridge, Exeter, cause unknown.
|-
|Fletcher, Walter Thomas||Sgt||NZ||23 Sqn||||
|-
|Flinders, John L "Polly"||Plt Off||BR||32 Sqn||||Died 1988
|- style="background:#2ee;"
|Flood, Fredrick William||Flt Lt||AUS||235 Sqn||||MIA 11 September 1940
|- style="background:silver;"
|Flower, Hubert Luiz||Sgt||BR||248 Sqn||||Surviving aircrew|-
|Foglar, Vaclav||Sgt||CZ||245 Sqn||||KIFA Dec 1947
|-
|Foit, Emil Antonin||Plt Off||CZ||85 Sqn||DFC||Died 1976
|-
|Fokes, Ronald Henry||Sgt||BR||92 Sqn||DFM||KIA 12 June 1944
|-
|Folliard, James Henry||AC||BR||604 Sqn||||Died 1981
|-
|Fopp, Desmond||Sgt||AUS||17 Sqn||AFC||
|-
|Forbes, Athol Stanhope||Flt Lt||BR||303 & 66 Sqns||||Official Ace; Died 1981
|-
|Ford, Ernest George||Sgt||CAN||3 & 232 Sqn||||KIA 12 December 1942 (Canada)
|-
|Ford, Roy Clement "Henry"||Sgt||BR||41 Sqn||||Born Hastings, Sussex, 1915 Commissioned Nov 1940; released from RAF, Oct 1945; commissioned in RAFVR, Sep 1947; retired May 1952 Died December 2002
|-
|Forde, Derek Nigel||Fg Off||BR||145 & 605 Sqns||DFC||Died 16 January 1979
|-
|Forrest, Dudley Henry||Sgt||BR||66 Sqn & 421 Flt||||
|-
|Forrester, George Mathwin||Plt Off||BR||605 Sqn||||KIA 9 September 1940 (collided with He111)
|-
|Forshaw, Terence Henry Trimble||Flt Lt||BR||19, 616 & 609 Sqns||||
|-
|Forster, Anthony Douglas||Fg Off||BR||151 & 607 Sqns||DFC||
|-
|Forsyth, Colin Leo Malcolm||Sgt||NZ||23 Sqn||DFC, DFM||KIA 8 May 1944
|-
|Forward, Ronald Victor||Sgt||BR||257 Sqn||||
|- style="background:silver;"
|Foster, Robert William||Plt Off||BR||605 Sqn||DFC||Surviving aircrew|-
|Fotheringham, Allan Cook||Sgt||BR||3 Sqn||||Captured and made POW 15 February 1941 Died 1984
|-
|Fott, E A||Plt Off||CZ||310 Sqn||||Service details unknown
|-
|Fowler, Alfred Lawrence||Plt Off||NZ||248 Sqn||DFC||KIFA 23 August 1941
|-
|Fowler, Reginald John||Sgt||BR||247 Sqn||||
|-
|Fox, Lawrence||AC1||BR||29 Sqn||||
|-
|Fox, Peter Hutton||Sgt||BR||56 Sqn||||Captured and made POW 28 June 1941; Died
|-
|Foxley-Norris, Christopher Neil||Fg Off||BR||3 Sqn||DSO, OBE, GCB||Retired 1974 with the rank of AVM. Died 28 September 2003
|-
|Fox-Male, Dennis Humbert||Plt Off||BR||152 Sqn||||Died 1 April 1986
|-
|Francis, A||Sgt||BR||3 Sqn||||Service details unknown
|- style="background:#2ee;"
|Francis, Colin Dunstone||Plt Off||BR||253 Sqn||||KIA 30 August 1940
|-
|Francis, Clarence William "Bill"||Sgt||BR||74 & 3 Sqns||||
|-
|Francis, Douglas Norman||Sgt||BR||257 Sqn||||Died 7 January 1961
|-
|Francis, John||Sgt||BR||23 Sqn||||
|-
|Francis, Noel Inglis Chalmers||Sgt||BR||247 Sqn||||KIA 9 December 1941
|-
|Franklin, Walter Derrick Kerr||Fg Off||JAM||74 Sqn||||Died 25 October 2001
|- style="background:#2ee;"
|Franklin, William Henry||Plt Off||BR||65 Sqn||DFM*||Official Ace, MIA 12 December 1940
|- style="background:#2ee;"
|František, Josef||Sgt||CZ||303 Sqn||CdeG, DFM*, VM||KIFA 8 October 1940
|- style="background:#2ee;"
|Fraser, Robert Henry Braund||Sgt||BR||257 Sqn||||KIA 22 October 1940
|-
|Freeborn, John Connell||Fg Off||BR||74 Sqn||DFC*||Official Ace, (1 December 1919 – 28 August 2010)
|-
|Freeman, Richard Powell||Sgt||BR||29 Sqn||||
|-
|Freer, Peter Foster||PO||BR||29 Sqn||||KIA 11 May 1941
|-
|Freese, Laurence Eric||Sgt||BR||611 & 74 Sqn||||KIA 10 January 1941
|-
|French, Thomas Lennox||Sgt||BR||29 Sqn||||KIA 14 December 1942
|-
|Frey, Juliusz A K W||Flt Lt||POL||607 Sqn||KW||
|-
|Friend, Jack Richard||Sgt||BR||25 Sqn||||KIA 7 December 1940
|-
|Friendship, Alfred Henry Basil||Plt Off||BR||3 Sqn||DFM||
|-
|Fripp, Joffre Harry||Sgt||BR||248 Sqn||||Died 1973
|-
|Frisby, Edward Murray||Fg Off||BR||504 Sqn||||KIA 5 December 1941
|- style="background:#2ee;"
|Frith, Eric Thomas G||Sgt||BR||611 & 92 Sqns||||WIA 9 October 1940, Died 17 October 1940
|-
|Frizell, Charles George||Plt Off||CAN||257 Sqn||||
|-
|Frost, Jack Lynch||Plt Off||BR||600 Sqn||||
|-
|Fulford, David||Sgt||BR||64 & 19 Sqns||DFC||KIA 2 November 1942
|-
|Fumerton, Robert Carl "Moose"||Plt Off||CAN||32 Sqn||DFC*, AFC||
|-
|Furneaux, Rex Horton||Sgt||BR||3 & 73 Sqns||||
|-
|Furst, Bohumir||Sgt||CZ||310 & 605 Sqns||||Died 2 January 1978
|}

Notes on table
Ranks given are those held during the Battle of Britain, although a higher rank may have been achieved after the Battle.
All individuals listed in bold and highlighted in silver are believed to be still alive.
Aircrew listed as KIA, MIA, WIA or KIFA during the Battle of Britain are highlighted in blue.
The awards listed include those made during the Battle of Britain and during the remainder of World War II, as well as any made post-war.
In order to limit the numbers of footnotes which would otherwise be required, the symbol ‡ under "Notes" indicates several entries in the text of Ramsay 1989, while the symbol †''' indicates that information on the circumstances under which an airman became a casualty during the Battle is included in the text of the book. Where more than one crew member of a multi place aircraft was involved this is included as a cross-reference under "Notes"
In addition to 2,353 British aircrew, the RAF Roll of Honour recognises 574 personnel from other countries; namely:
Australia, Barbados, Belgium, Canada, Czechoslovakia, France, Ireland, Jamaica, Newfoundland, New Zealand, Poland, Rhodesia, South Africa and the United States.

Abbreviations
(CO) after "Sqn" denotes Commanding Officer of that squadron, as per the RAF Fighter Command Order of Battle on 15 September 1940, unless otherwise indicated.
(FAA) after a rank denotes a member of the Fleet Air Arm rather than the RAF.
"KIA" – "killed in action"
"KIFA" – "killed in flying accident", i.e. not during combat
"MIA" – "missing in action".
"WIA" – "wounded in action" leading to death which, in some cases, may have occurred months later.
"POW" – "prisoner of war".
For details of RAF rank abbreviations, see RAF Commissioned Officer Ranks and RAF Non-Commissioned Officer Ranks.
For details of FAA rank abbreviations, see FAA Commissioned Officer Ranks.

Nationalities

Awards

See also
Non-British personnel in the RAF during the Battle of Britain
List of World War II aces from the United Kingdom
List of World War II flying aces by country
List of World War II flying aces
List of RAF aircrew in the Battle of Britain (A–C)
List of RAF aircrew in the Battle of Britain (G–K)
List of RAF aircrew in the Battle of Britain (L–N)
List of RAF aircrew in the Battle of Britain (O–R)
List of RAF aircrew in the Battle of Britain (S–U)
List of RAF aircrew in the Battle of Britain (V–Z)

Notes
Notes

Citations

Bibliography

Ramsay, Winston, ed. The Battle of Britain Then and Now Mk V. London: Battle of Britain Prints International Ltd, 1989. .
Ringlstetter, Herbert (2005). Helmut Wick, An Illustrated Biography of the Luftwaffe Ace And Commander of Jagdgeschwader 2 During The Battle of Britain''. Atglen, PA: Schiffer Publishing. .

Remembering the Battle of Britain
Robert Dixon, '607 Squadron: A Shade of Blue'. The History Press 2008. 
Robert Dixon, 'A Gathering of Eagles' PublishBritannica 2004, 

RAF aircrew